Osensjøen or Ossjøen is a lake in the municipalities of Åmot and Trysil in Innlandet County, Norway. The  lake has its outlet through Søre Osa to the Renaelva river which continues on to the large river Glomma. The village of Osneset lies at the north end of the lake. Nordre Osen Church and the Old Nordre Osen Church both lie on the northern shore of the lake. The Søre Osen Church lies along the southeastern end of the lake.

See also
List of lakes in Norway

References

Trysil
Åmot
Lakes of Innlandet